The Lada Revolution was a concept car first presented in 2003 by Russian brand Lada (part of AvtoVAZ). It was an open, single-seater sports car powered by a 1.6 L engine producing .

References

External links

Lada concept vehicles